The Inter-American Center of Tax Administrations "CIAT" is an international organization specialized in training and exchanges of information between national tax administrations.

The CIAT is an international public, non-profit organization that provides specialized technical assistance for the updating and modernization of tax administrations. It is a founding member of the Network of Tax Organizations (NTO), a network of regional and international tax administrations that aims to develop and promote effective tax systems around the world that contribute to the well-being of people.

Member countries 
Since its creation in 1967 and until now,  the CIAT groups 42 member countries and associate member countries: 32 American countries, five European countries, four African countries and one Asian country. Angola, India, Morocco and Nigeria are associate member countries. CIAT is part of the International Tax Dialogue.

Members may be all those American countries that are invited to join or those whose application for membership is accepted by the General Assembly. There is a special category of "associate member". The General Assembly may accept as Associate Member countries non-American countries that request it and have the approval of the Executive Council.

Guidelines
Carry out cooperative actions that strengthen tax administrations through the exchange of experiences and good practices, in order to facilitate and promote voluntary compliance, combat fraud, tax evasion and avoidance
Develop and disseminate information, studies, research, innovative practices, and other products to improve tax policy and tax administration.
Design, promote and carry out training and human talent development activities in coordination with the tax administrations.
Design, promote and execute training and human talent development activities in coordination with tax administrations.
Develop internal management and external coordination policies for the institutional strengthening of CIAT.

History

CIAT Foundation
After a tour made in 1965 to the United States of America by authorities of tax administrations of American countries, called to know and discuss in the field the fundamental problems of tax administration, Sheldon Cohen and Harold Moss, then respectively Commissioner and Director of the Office of International Assistance of the Internal Revenue Service of the United States, had the vision of creating an organization to serve as a permanent forum for the consideration of the problems of tax administrations.

For this purpose, a Steering Committee was appointed to structure the foundations of a multilateral agency of tax administrators. The Committee was composed of: Sheldon Cohen and Harold Moss (USA), Roberto Hoyo and Alfredo Gutiérrez (Mexico), Jaime Ross and Tomás Aguayo (Chile), Menalco Solís and Targidio Bernal (Panama) and Edison Gnazzo and Emilio Vidal (Uruguay). At meetings held in 1965 and 1966, said Committee drafted the Statutes of the organization.

In May 1967, during the first General Assembly held in Panama, the Statutes of the Inter - American Center of Tax Administrators-CIAT were approved. In 1997, a change in the name of the Center was approved, becoming the Inter-American Center of Tax Administrations, to emphasize the institutional nature of the organization.

Evolution of CIAT's activities 
Until 1977, CIAT's activities were mainly directed to the organization of international meetings (annual assembly, conferences and technical seminars), the publication of a newsletter and the creation and maintenance of a library specialized in tax issues. In that year, a Technical Cooperation Agreement was signed with the Federal Republic of Germany, which established a permanent mission to CIAT with significant benefits for the organization and its member countries. The Agreement was maintained until 1997 and facilitated CIAT's action in the field of technical assistance.3

Technical cooperation agreements were concluded in 1982 and 1983 with France and Spain respectively. As a result, the permanent missions of these countries were established at CIAT headquarters in Panama. These agreements enabled CIAT to enhance activities for the benefit of its member countries.

In 1983, the Regional Technical Cooperation Project on the Single Register of Taxpayers and Current Account, TIN/CA, for Central America and the Caribbean, financed by IDB and executed by CIAT, was also launched. From there, our Center would act as a specialized agency providing technical assistance services for the tax administrations of Latin America and the Caribbean.

In 1987, during the General Assembly of Uruguay, the reform of the Statutes was approved. creating the category of Associate Members, to which Spain and Portugal joined in 1990, France in 1991, Italy in 1995 and the Netherlands in 1996.

The process of institutional evolution continued in the 90's: on the one hand, with the increasing use of information technology and management tools such as strategic planning, and, on the other hand, the approach and a greater commitment of european member countries, culminating in the year 2001 with the acquisition of the status of full members of five of them. Another notable event in the development of CIAT was the incorporation of South Africa in the Assembly of Bolivia in 2004, Kenya in the General Assembly of Brazil in 2006, and India in the General Assembly of Guatemala in 2009, as associate member countries.

The participation of all these countries has made it possible to increase and substantially improve the possibilities of CIAT to meet its objective of supporting the improvement and modernization of the administrations of its member countries.

The volume and scope of CIAT's activities, as well as the number of member countries and associate members from different continents, has expanded significantly since its creation, making CIAT the largest organization worldwide that brings together tax administrations and has signed cooperation agreements with the most important international public and private entities specialized in tax matters, such as the nine organizations that make up the NTO, or the GIZ of Germany.

Membership 
Member countries' tax administrations and Associate member countries' tax administrations
 Angola -Tax General Administration
Argentina: Federal Administration of Public Revenues
Aruba:  Directorate of Taxes and Customs
Barbados: Barbados Revenue Authority
Belize: Income Tax Department
Bermuda: Ministry of Finance
Bolivia: Servicio de Impuestos Nacionale
Brazil: Federal Revenues of Brazil
Canada: Canada Revenue Agency
Chile: Internal Revenue Service
Colombia: Directorate of Taxes and National Customs
Costa Rica: General Directorate of Taxation
Cuba: National Tax Administration Office
Curacao: Inspectorate of Taxes of Curacao
Dominican Republic: General Directorate of Internal Taxes
Ecuador: Internal Revenue Service
El Salvador: General Directorate of Internal Taxes
France: General Directorate of Public Finances
Guatemala: Superintendency of Tax Administration
Guyana: Guyana Revenue Authority
Haiti: General Directorate of Taxes
Honduras: Income Administration Service - SAR
India: Ministry of Finance
Italy: Finance Guard
Jamaica:  Tax Administration Jamaica
Kenya: Kenian Revenue Authority
Mexico: Tax Administration Service
Morocco: Ministry of Economy and Finance
Netherlands: Ministry of Finance
Nicaragua: General Directorate of Revenues
Nigeria: Federal Inland Revenue Service
Panama: General Directorate of Revenues
Paraguay: State Undersecretariat of Taxation
Peru: Customs and Tax Administration National Superintendency
Portugal: Tax Customs Authority
Spain: State Agency of Tax Administration
Sint Maarten: Ministry of Finance
Suriname: Directorate of Taxes
Trinidad y Tobago: Inland Revenue Division
United States of America: Internal Revenue Service
Uruguay: General Directorate of Taxation
Venezuela: Integrated National Service of Customs and Tax Administration

See also

 Economy of the Americas
 Intra-European Organisation of Tax Administrations
 List of countries by tax rates
 List of countries by tax revenue to GDP ratio

References

External links 

Intergovernmental organizations
International taxation
OECD
Tax avoidance
International organizations based in Panama
Tax organizations
Tax administration